S.V. Vespo is a football team, from the town of Rincon on Bonaire in the Caribbean Netherlands, playing at the top level. Vespo was founded on 9 April 1959 and plays in the Bonaire League.

Achievements
Bonaire League: Champion
1994–95, 2006–07

FFB Cup 60 years: Champion
2020

Current squad

References

External links 
Official website

Football clubs in Bonaire
Football clubs in the Netherlands Antilles
1959 establishments in Bonaire
Association football clubs established in 1959